The Baraolt Mountains is a mountain range, entirely in Covasna County of Romania.  

Geologically the Baraolts are part of the Căliman-Harghita Mountains, of the Inner Eastern Carpathians. By traditional Romanian categorization it's included in the Curvature Carpathians.  

The largest city in the area is Sfântu Gheorghe, along with the towns of Baraolt and Malnaș. The Baraolt Mountains is a popular hiking area.

References 

Mountain ranges of Romania
Mountain ranges of the Eastern Carpathians